Medipally Nakkartha is a village located in Yacharam Mandal, Rangareddy district, Telangana, India, with a population of approximately 5,000 people.

This village has a high school and a primary school, both are run by the government of Telangana.

The primary languages used are that of Telugu and Urdu. The village sits at an elevation of 523 meters above the sea level.

History 
This village was under the control of Deshpandya and Deshmuk (Venkatrama Rao and Palamkush Rao). It was controlled by Grama Karnamu (Patvari), Grama Munsib (Police Inspector Karnati Jogi Reddy and Nijamuddin), and Grama Mali Patel (Revenue officer). The village was under the constituency of Ranga Reddy (Dist). Its name was formed with the combination of two villages, named Nakkartha and Medipally. A nearby village Nanak Nagar was also part of this village Panchayat until 1986.

Geography 
Nakkartha Medipally is located on the 17.003° north latitude and 78.654° east longitude. It has an average elevation of about 585 meters (1920 feet) above sea level. The total area of the village is 2018 hectares. It is located in the Yacharam Mandal of Ranga Reddy district in Telangana, India. Near the well known Nagarjuna Sagar about 7  km away and is surrounded by the mountains on three sides.

Religious places 
The people of the villages are religiously diverse with prominent religious being Hindu, Islam and Christianity. It is important to note that different places in the village are considered sacred by these groups. This religious difference allows for a wide range of mixed beliefs in the area.

Hindu 
The village has a large Hindu temple complex with temples for Rama, Shiva, Hanuman, etc. There are many temples for Beerappa, Maisamma, Pochamma, Mahankali, Mallanna, Veeranna, etc. along the borders of village. There is a famous temple for Narsimhaswami on a hill called Narasimha gutta. It receives worshippers every year. Additionally, there is a temple for Lord Hanuman who receives worshippers, mostly on Saturdays.

Muslim  
The Village also has a large Mosque with prayer facilities accommodating the religious needs of the Muslim community.

Christian 
There is a Church for Christians to pray at.

Transport 
The village has good transport facilities. It has regular buses that run every hour to the nearest town Ibrahim patnam which is 65 km away from Hyderabad. There are buses to a nearby town called Mall. The Secunderabad railway station is just 50 km away from the village. Additionally, the village has good auto services for hire.

Politics 

The village Sarpanch is Pache Basha (elected in 2014). The village MPTC is Mote Srisailam.

Grampanchayat 
The village is run by the village Grampanchayat. It consists of VRO, Sarpanch, MPTC, 12 ward-members, political leaders, etc..

Schools 
There were Urdu medium schools in the past in the village. The village had a Zilla Parishad High School, two Mandal Parishad Primary Schools, and Pudami The English Primaries school.

ZPHS 
The school is located at the village entrance beside the Indian Bank. The school is spread over an area of 5 acres. It has a strength of about 600 students from five nearby villages. The school has a facility of teaching in both English and Telugu medium. The school had got a result of 88 percent in the academic year 2015–16. The school has good, experienced teachers compared to other schools in the district.

Primary school 
The primary school is located beside the ZPHS school. The school has 200 students currently enrolled. English medium of study is recently introduced by the Telangana government in the year 2016.

Other schools 
The children of the village go to other schools in the surrounding villages. They go to schools namely, PUDAMI THE NEIGHBORHOOD SCHOOL, JOVIAL HIGH SCHOOL, ST. PAUL'S HIGH SCHOOL, JAN PETER MEMORIAL SCHOOL, etc.

Schooling remarks 

 Many movements and rallies were arranged by the school students on behalf of politics, development and awareness programs.

College 
There are no colleges in the village. The children travel to the nearby town of Yacharam & Ibrahimpatnam for college study and many also travel to Hyderabad and many other nearby cities for better education facilities.

Agriculture

Ponds 
There are three ponds under the village panchayat. They are Akva cheruvu (ఎక్వ చెరువు), Uura cheruvu (ఊర చెరువు) and choor cheruvu (చోర్ చెరువు).
The village has drylands. Almost 90 percent of the people depend on agriculture. The farmers depend on rains for cultivation as it has low ground water level. They mostly cultivate dryland crops, only some cultivate paddy. They cultivate cotton, jowar, cereals etc.
The village has all kinds of soils. It mostly has red soils. Black and alluvial soils are found in some places.

Bank 
The village has an Indian Bank. People from five nearby villages use this bank.

Climate 
Medipally Nakkartha has a tropical wet and dry climate (Köppen Aw) bordering on a hot semi-arid climate (Köppen BSh) similar to that of the Hyderabad region.[47] The annual mean temperature is 26.6°C (79.9°F); monthly mean temperatures are 21–33°C (70–91°F).[48] Summers (March–June) are hot and humid, with average highs in the mid-to-high 30's Celsius;[49] maximum temperatures often exceed 40°C (104°F) between April and June.[48] The coolest temperatures occur in December and January when the lowest temperature occasionally dips to 10°C (50°F).[48] May is the hottest month, when daily temperatures range from 26 to 39°C (79–102°F); December, the coldest, has temperatures varying from 14.5 to 28°C (57–82°F).[49]

References 

Villages in Ranga Reddy district